KFGR (88.1 FM) is a Christian radio station licensed to Powell, Wyoming, United States. The station serves eastern Park County, Wyoming and western Big Horn County, Wyoming, and is owned by Trinity Bible Church.

KFGR first came on the air in 2003, and originally broadcast on 105.3 in Powell, Wyoming as a low power station. KFGR moved to 88.1 in December 2009, with 105.3 becoming KLWR-LP.

References

External links
KFGR's official website

FGR
Powell, Wyoming